Tooting is a district in South London, forming part of the London Borough of Wandsworth and partly in the London Borough of Merton.

History

Tooting has been settled since pre-Saxon times. The name is of Anglo-Saxon origin but the meaning is disputed. It could mean the people of Tota, in which context Tota may have been a local Anglo-Saxon chieftain. Alternatively it could be derived from an old meaning of the verb to tout, to look out. There may have been a watchtower here on the road to London and hence the people of the look-out post.

The Romans built a road, which was later named Stane Street by the English, from London (Londinium) to Chichester (Noviomagus Regnorum), and which passed through Tooting. Tooting High Street is built on this road. In Saxon times, Tooting and Streatham (then Toting-cum-Stretham) was given to the Abbey of Chertsey. Later, Suene (Sweyn), believed to be a Viking, may have been given all or part of the land. In 933, King Athelstan is thought to have confirmed lands including Totinge (Tooting) to Chertsey Abbey.

Its people were called to render £4 per year to their overlords. Later in the Norman period, it came into the possession of the De Gravenel family, after whom it was named Tooting Graveney. The ancient parish of Tooting Graveney included the southern part of what is now Streatham.

Upper Tooting, or Tooting Bec (for centuries administered as part of Streatham), appears as a manor held by the Abbey of Hellouin Bec, in Normandy, thus acquiring the "Bec" in its name. Its domesday assets were 5 hides. It had  ploughlands and so was assessed as rendering £7.

As with many of South London's suburbs, Tooting developed during the late Victorian period. Some development occurred in the Edwardian era but another large spurt in growth happened during the 1920s and 30s.

 1902: Tooting Library opened as a one-storey structure. A second storey was added in 1906. In 2012 the library was extended and refurbished
 1906: Tooting Bec Lido opened
 1930: St Benedict's Hospital established by the London County Council
 1931: Granada cinema opened with the film Monte Carlo
 1954: St George's Hospital begins to relocate to Tooting from Hyde Park Corner, taking over the old Grove Fever and Fountain Hospitals
 2003: Redevelopment of St George's Hospital buildings completed

Politics
The Member of Parliament for Tooting is Dr Rosena Allin-Khan of the Labour Party, who was first elected in a 2016 by-election to represent the parliamentary constituency of Tooting. This followed the election of her predecessor Sadiq Khan to the role of Mayor of London in May 2016.

Since the creation of the Tooting seat, it has been held by Labour, often with a marginal result against a Conservative Party challenge. Although the constituency boundaries include wards represented by both Labour and the Conservatives, the Tooting ward itself can be regarded as a Labour stronghold, electing a full slate of councillors from the party.

Demographics
Tooting has a large British Asian community and has gained the nickname "land of the curry mile" due to the concentration of South Asian restaurants.

In the 2011 census, Tooting was White or White British (47%), Asian or Asian British (28.8%), Black or Black British (15.5%), Mixed/multiple ethnic groups (5%), and Other ethnic group (2.9%). The largest single ethnicity is White British (32.4%).

The main spoken first languages are English, followed by Urdu, Polish and Gujarati.

Transport

Tooting is positioned on the Northern line—with stations at the top and the bottom of the hill that slopes down the High Street, Tooting Bec and Tooting Broadway. Tooting is also served by National Rail at Tooting railway station providing a direct link south to Sutton via Wimbledon, and north to Farringdon, St Pancras and on to Luton.

It also has several bus links, with routes to and from Central London, Richmond, Croydon, Sutton and Kingston amongst others.

Tooting Broadway tube station is currently being considered by TfL as a stop on the future Crossrail 2 development. In addition to relieving congestion on the Northern Line, this would provide Tooting with a rapid and direct connection to major London stations such as Clapham Junction, Victoria, Tottenham Court Road and Euston.

Conservation area
Totterdown Fields estate was designated a conservation area on 19 September 1978. It was influenced by Ebenezer Howard's Garden city movement and the Arts and Crafts movement.

Social housing estates
As previously mentioned, Totterdown Fields estate has considerable historical significance, being the first "cottage estate" within London and later protected from redevelopment through its designation as a conservation area. Within the London Borough of Wandsworth, Tooting has the fourth-highest number of social housing accommodation after Roehampton, Battersea and Southfields in that order. Notable large post-modern estates within the area are the: Aboyne/Holborn and Hazelhurst with smaller estates including: Bevill Allen Close, Burtop Road, Copeland House, Flowersmead, Newlands and Tooting Grove.

Open spaces

A large open area, popularly known as the Tooting Commons, lies at the northern end of Tooting. Historically this was two separate open spaces: Tooting Graveney Common (formerly part of Tooting Graveney parish), and Tooting Bec Common (formerly part of Streatham parish).

Sport
Tooting shares two football clubs with nearby Mitcham: Tooting & Mitcham FC and Tooting & Mitcham Wanderers FC.

A greyhound racing track, the 'Wimbledon Stadium', was narrowly in Tooting on Plough Lane. AFC Wimbledon moved to the site in 2021.

Markets
Tooting has two indoor markets, with numbers of permanent stalls. The entrances of both are situated on the same street, Tooting High Street, only a few metres apart. They both have many types of outlets, but since the 2010s have also developed a focus on street food stalls. Tooting Market is the smaller of the two; the other, The Broadway Market, is one of the largest of London's indoor markets, having more than ninety stalls, and has been active since 1936.

Notable people
 Stephen K Amos (b. 1967), comedian
 Raymond Austin, aka Raymond DeVere-Austin, Baron of Delvin, film stuntman, actor, TV and film director, author
 Darren Bent (b. 1984), professional footballer
 Jamie Bulloch (b. 1969), translator
 Jeremy Bulloch (1945–2020), actor, best known for playing Boba Fett in the early Star Wars films
 Dave Clement (1948–1982), professional footballer
 George Cole (1925–2015), actor
 Sadie Crawford (1885–1965), stage musician
 Fuse ODG (b. 1988), rapper
 Girlschool, band
 Milton Jones (b. 1965), comedian
Rachel Agatha Keen, (b. 1997), also known as Raye, Pop & R&B singer, notable for songs like "Secrets" & "You Don't Know Me"
 Sadiq Khan (b. 1970), Labour politician (Mayor of London, former Tooting MP)
 Ramona Marquez (b. 2001), actress
 Tony Meo (b. 1959), professional snooker player
 Paul Merton (b. 1957), comedian
 Clinton Morrison (b. 1979), professional footballer
 New Musik, band
 Natasha O'Keeffe (b. 1986), actress
 Gino Rea (b. 1989), motorcycle racer
 Leroy Rosenior (b. 1964), professional football coach
 Sangharakshita, writer, Buddhist commentator, and founder of the Triratna Buddhist Community, born Dennis Lingwood in Tooting
 Bas Savage (b. 1982), professional footballer
 Tony Selby (b. 1938), actor
 Paul Sinha (b. 1970), comedian and broadcaster
 Snakefinger (1949–1987), musician
 Richard Strange (b. 1951), musician
 Jay Tabb (b. 1984), professional footballer
 Quade Taylor (b. 1993), professional footballer
 UK Subs, band
 Henning Wehn (b. 1974), comedian
 Jimmy White (b. 1962), professional snooker player
 Matt Willis (b. 1983), musician

Cultural references
In André Charlot's West End revue The Charlot Show of 1926, Jessie Matthews and Henry Lytton, Jnr. sang "Silly Little Hill", which features the lyric "there's no fishing, there’s no shooting dear / and no cyclists fresh from Tooting dear", which they also recorded that year.

The Ealing Studios film Kind Hearts and Coronets (1949), starring Alec Guinness, references Tooting Bec as the residence of one of the characters.

The BBC comedy series Hugh & I (1962–67) was set in the fictional Lobelia Avenue in Tooting.

The BBC comedy series Citizen Smith (1977–80) was set in Tooting and popularised the cry "Freedom for Tooting!". The lead character in the series, Wolfie Smith (Robert Lindsay), was the founder of a fictional revolutionary socialist political organisation, the Tooting Popular Front.

The Kitchens of Distinction (who formed in the area) recorded "On Tooting Broadway Station" on their album The Death of Cool (1992).

In 2005, a 28 km diameter crater on Mars was named after Tooting. A geologic map of Tooting Crater was published in 2015 by the U.S. Geological Survey.

The phrase "Ting Tong from Tooting" is associated with the character Ting Tong from the UK comedy sketch show Little Britain.

Tooting was the setting for the eponymous 2013 British-Tamil crime drama Gangs of Tooting Broadway.

In the film Johnny English Reborn, Agent Tucker lives in Tooting.

Channel 4's award-winning documentary series 24 Hours in A&E was filmed at St George's Hospital in Tooting.

In the BBC comedy drama Fleabag, the title character's sister Claire says she is from Tooting.

In the second season of Apple TV comedy Ted Lasso, Tooting is referenced as the home of a fictional Greek restaurant called A Taste of Athens.

References

External links

 Tooting Newsie

 
Areas of London
Districts of the London Borough of Wandsworth
Major centres of London